Charles Grenzbach (December 29, 1923 – March 29, 2004) was an American sound engineer. He won an Academy Award for Best Sound and was nominated for two more in the same category. He worked on more than 130 films between 1956 and 1989.

Selected filmography
Grenzbach won an Academy Award and was nominated for two more:

Won
 Platoon (1986)

Nominated
 The Godfather (1972)
 Chinatown (1974)

References

External links

1923 births
2004 deaths
American audio engineers
Musicians from New York City
Best Sound Mixing Academy Award winners
Daytime Emmy Award winners
Emmy Award winners
Engineers from New York City
20th-century American engineers